Talal Jebreen (born 25 September 1973) is a Saudi Arabian football midfielder who played for Saudi Arabia in the 1994 FIFA World Cup. He also played for Al-Riyadh.

References

1973 births
Saudi Arabian footballers
Saudi Arabia international footballers
Association football midfielders
1994 FIFA World Cup players
Living people
Al-Riyadh SC players